"You'd Be So Nice to Come Home To" is a popular song written by Cole Porter for the 1943 film Something to Shout About, where it was introduced by Janet Blair and Don Ameche. The song was nominated for the Academy Award for Best Original Song in 1943 but lost to "You'll Never Know".

Other recordings
 Dinah Shore had a hit with the song at the time of its introduction.
 Helen Merrill with Clifford Brown – Helen Merrill (1954)
 Cannonball Adderley – Compact Jazz -  Capitol - (1955)
 Art Pepper – Art Pepper Meets the Rhythm Section (1957)
 Coleman Hawkins and Ben Webster – Coleman Hawkins Encounters Ben Webster (1957)
 Frank Sinatra – A Swingin' Affair! (1957)
 Bing Crosby and Rosemary Clooney recorded the song for their radio show in 1958 and it was released on the album Bing & Rosie – The Crosby-Clooney Radio Sessions (2010).
 Nina Simone – Nina Simone at Newport (1960)
 Jo Stafford with Ben Webster – Jo + Jazz (1960)
 Al Cohn and Zoot Sims – You 'n' Me (1960)
 Julie London – Julie...At Home  (1960)
 The Coasters – One by One (1960)
 Lee Konitz – Motion (1961)
 Jim Hall with Chet Baker and Paul Desmond  – Concierto – (1975)
 Joey DeFrancesco – Singin' and Swingin'  (1999)
 Dick Hyman and Randy Sandke – Now & Again (2004)
 Tina May, accompanied by pianist Nikki Iles – A Wing and a Prayer (2006)
 Jacky Terrasson – Push (2010)
 Xiu Xiu – Nina (2013)
 Harry Connick Jr. (2019)
 Marisa Anderson, Tara Jane O'Neil (2020)
 Bernie Dresel – The Pugilist (2021)

References

1942 songs
1943 singles
Songs written for films
Songs written by Cole Porter
Dinah Shore songs
The Coasters songs
Nina Simone songs
Jo Stafford songs